Bad Vöslau (Central Bavarian: Bod Vöslau) is a spa town in the Lower Austria federal state of Austria. It is also known as the cradle of the Austrian red wine cultivation. Population (2008): 11,190.

Geography 
Bad Vöslau is located 35 km south of Vienna on the slope of the Vienna Woods mountains to the Vienna Basin. The Thermenlinie fault line running there is the cause of several thermal springs.

Municipality Structure 
The municipality is composed of three localities and cadastral communities, namely Bad Vöslau (cadastral community: Vöslau), Gainfarn, and Großau.

History 
Traces of colonization dating back to the Neolithic period have been found in the area.

In the Roman era the place was part of Pannonia province. Already then the thermal springs were used.

The name “Vöslau” (as in: Adololdus de Veselove) was first found in a written document of Klosterneuburg Monastery dating from 1136. In that time, the place was only a castle that was encircled by a ditch. It was destroyed by King Matthias Corvinus in 1483, but was subsequently rebuilt. It became of great significance during the Reformation movement.

During the Counter-Reformation the parish of Vöslau was incorporated in neighbouring Gainfarn parish.

In the 18th century, the Vöslau lordship was purchased by the influential Fries family. Count Johann von Fries, whose vineyards were situated around Vöslau, was the first to grow red wine on a large scale in this region. Under the Fries family, Vöslau took a boom. The old castle was expanded and remodelled in Baroque style.

After Count Moritz von Fries had gone bankrupt in 1826, Giorgios Sinas acquired Vöslau palace and lordship, but sold it to Johann Heinrich von Geymüller the Younger just one year later. In 1833, Geymüller established the Vöslau worsted factory (Vöslauer Kammgarnfabrik), which became a major source of employment in Vöslau until it had to be closed down in 1978.

In 1841, the Southern Railway to (then) Neunkirchen was opened, so that Vöslau could now be reached by train via (now) Bad Vöslau railway station. In the second half of the 19th century, tourism became another major economic sector. Wealthy families used to spend the summer months in rented houses with their entire households. For this purpose, villas were built on the slopes west of the village centre. In 1822, a first public bath was opened; large portions of it were built anew 1869–73 by architect Theophil Hansen.

On August 26, 1867, the Treaty of Vöslau was signed between the Kingdom of Greece and the Principality of Serbia.

In 1904 Vöslau was officially declared a spa town; the name of the municipality, though, was not until 1928 changed to Bad Vöslau (by resolution of the Landtag of Lower Austrian [the state parliament] of March 27, 1928). The public swimming baths were again rebuilt and were opened on June 20, 1926, with Federal President Michael Hainisch attending.

In 1936, a company was founded to merchandise the thermal water, which is being sold under the brand name "Vöslauer" (add: Mineralwasser, i. e. mineral water) since then.

Wine-growing is stil another important part of the economy. The red wine and the sparkling wine from Vöslau were made famous worldwide by Robert Schlumberger in the 19th century. 

In 1954, Bad Vöslau became a city and the brand "Vöslauer Stadtsiegel" was created. On January 1, 1972 the neighbouring municipalities of Gainfarn and Großau were incorporated into Bad Vöslau.

Populations

Politics 
The Bad Vöslau city council (Gemeinderat) consists of 37 seats. As of the 2020 elections, these are allocated as follows:

 19 Liste Flammer (an independent faction founded by Alfred Flammer)
 7 GREEN Party
 4 ÖVP
 3 SPÖ
 2 FPÖ
 2 NEOS

In December 2022, Christian Flammer succeeded Christoph Prinz, who stepped down, as mayor.

Personalities 

 Johann von Fries (1719–1785): The counts of Fries were, with an interruption, from 1773 to 1902 owner of the Vöslau dominion and both historically and economically of greatest importance for the development of the place
 Ami Boué (1794–1881) came from an emigrated French Huguenot family, traveled all over Europe as a geologist and ethnologist between 1812 and 1839. He wrote nine essays about the Vöslau springs between 1841 and 1874. He is buried in a crypt in the Vöslau cemetery.
 Robert Schlumberger von Goldeck (1814–1879), promotor of wine growing, was the first in Austria to produce sparkling wine by the traditional method of Champagne wine region in his Vöslau winery
 Ferdinand Piatnik (1819–1885), Austrian-Hungarian card painter, manufacturer, philanthropist, founder of Piatnik & Söhne
 Jacob Levy Moreno (1889–1974) was from 1918 to 1925 community physician and factory physician of the worsted factory. He was the founder of sociometry, group psychotherapy and "psychodrama", lived and worked in house Maital 4. He emigrated to the US in 1925.
 Jean Aberbach (1910–1992), born in Bad Vöslau. With his brother Julian Aberbach, he founded the Hill and Range music publishing house, which was instrumental in the careers of Elvis Presley, Johnny Cash, Ray Charles, Edith Piaf and Jacques Brel.
 Hannelore Valencak (1929–2004), Austrian writer, lived until her death in Bad Vöslau
 Arnulf Rainer (born 1929), Austrian painter, lived and worked 1953–59 in his family-owned villa in Gainfarn, Berggasse 18 
 Wolfgang Gratzer (born 1965 in Bad Vöslau), musicologist and book author. 2010–2014 Vice Rector for development and research of Mozarteum University Salzburg
 Felix Auböck (born 1996 in Bad Vöslau), Austrian 2016 Olympic swimmer

Economy and Traffic

Economy 
Main sources of income in Bad Vöslau are tourism and wine-growing. Also, Vöslauer mineral water from the thermal springs is bottled within the city limits and exported worldwide. On February 11, 2006, the new Bad Vöslau health resort was opened.

The area of the now defunct worsted factory has been refurbished by a group of investors and the premises are being let as storage, business, or office space under the name of Kammgarnzentrum (i. e. Worsted Centre). In the northeast of Bad Vöslau several stores and businesses are located that attract costumers even from outside the municipality.

Traffic

Road 
Through the centre of town Bad Vöslauer Straße B212 is running, connecting Bad Vöslau with Baden (north) and Berndorf (via Gainfarn and Großau, west). On Schlossplatz a branch road leads south to Kottingbrunn, Leobersdorf, and Wiener Neustadt.

East of town, Süd Autobahn A2 is running. There is an exit leading to Bad Vöslau. The southern parts of town, however, can also easily be reached via Kottingbrunn exit.

Rail and Public Transport 
East of the town's centre are the tracks of Südbahn (Southern Railway), with Bad Vöslau railway station. The station is served by local and regional trains. In front of the station building, public buses depart for various places in town and in the vicinity.

Air 
Near the eastern limits of town (and, for the larger part, on the territory of Kottingbrunn) lies Vöslau Airfield. It is a sport airfield, without line traffic. It came into public awareness when on April 15, 1955, an Austrian government delegation headed bei Federal Chancellor Julius Raab landed here returning from successful peace treaty negotiations with Soviet Union leaders in Moscow.

Images

Bad Vöslau

Gainfarn

Großau

References

External links 
 Town website (in German)

 
 Private gallery of Bad Vöslau

Spa towns in Austria
Baden District, Austria
Cities and towns in Baden District, Austria